Cyprus–Sweden relations are foreign relations between Cyprus and Sweden.  The two countries are members of the European Union, Council of Europe, the Organization for Security and Co-operation in Europe (OSCE) and the Union for the Mediterranean.
Cyprus has an embassy in Stockholm. Sweden has an embassy in Nicosia (Cyprus).

History
Diplomatic relations between Sweden and Cyprus were established in 1960, when Cyprus became an independent state. In 1994 Cyprus opened an embassy in Stockholm, while Sweden opened an embassy in Nicosia in 2004.

Eighth bilateral agreements have been concluded between Cyprus and Sweden.

Swedish archaeologists in Cyprus

Swedish archeologists and historians visit the island systematically. The most significant project was called Swedish Cyprus Expedition that took place between September 1927 and March 1931 and was led by three archaeologists: Einar Gjerstad, Erik Sjöqvist and Alfred Westholm together with architect John Lindros.

See also 
 Foreign relations of Cyprus
 Foreign relations of Sweden
 Neutral and Non-Aligned European States

References

External links 
 

 
Sweden
Bilateral relations of Sweden